Borriana is a commune in the province of Biella, Piedmont, northern Italy.

References

Cities and towns in Piedmont